The International Press Academy honored interactive products and interactive media features in the late 1990s and early 2000s with an annual Satellite Award.

Winners and nominees

Best Home Entertainment Product

Best Interactive Product

Outstanding Feature – Interactive Media

References

External links
 International Press Academy website

Interactive Media